The Rashtriya Kumar Gandharva Samman was established by the government of Madhya Pradesh in 1992 as an annual national honour presented to outstanding talent in the field of music. The award is named after Pandit Kumar Gandharva, an Indian classical singer of national and international repute.

Selection criteria 
The age limit of artists is between 25 and 45 years of age. Artists involved in Indian classical music, Carnatic music, and Hindustani music factions are considered for the award every year. Nominations for the Kumar Gandharva Samman are filed with the Department of Culture and a selection committee of experts makes the final decision. The recommendation of the selection committee is binding for the Madhya Pradesh government.

Recipients 
Recipients of the Kumar Gandharva Rashtriya Samman are given a scroll of honour and a cash prize of Rs. 1.25 lakh.

References 

Awards established in 1992
1992 establishments in Madhya Pradesh
Indian music awards
Government of Madhya Pradesh
Indian art awards